Emily Gerdes (sometimes credited as Emma Gerdes) was an American character actress active primarily during Hollywood's silent era.

Biography 
Emily was born in Jefferson, Kansas, to Herman Gerdes (a veterinarian) and Mary Ellen Glaze. The family soon moved to Missouri and then Arizona before later settling in Glendale, California. Her parents later divorced. In Los Angeles, Emily began appearing in films; her first known credit was in 1917's Rebecca of Sunnybrook Farm.

Selected filmography 
 Rebecca of Sunnybrook Farm (1917)
 A Lady's Name (1918)
 How Could You, Jean? (1918)
 Puppy Love (1919)
 Bell Boy 13 (1923)
 Dynamite Dan (1924)
 Behind Two Guns (1924)
 Heir-Loons (1925)
 Ella Cinders (1926)
 Unknown Dangers (1926)
 Daniel Boone Thru the Wilderness (1926)
 Heroes of the Wild (1927)
 Banjo on My Knee (1936) 
 The Grapes of Wrath (1940)

References 

American film actresses
1890 births
1974 deaths
Actresses from Kansas
20th-century American actresses